The 4th Pan American Acrobatic Gymnastics Championships was held in Bogotá, Colombia from November 18 to 20, 2022. The competition was organized by the Colombian Gymnastics Federation and approved by the International Gymnastics Federation.

Participating nations
  (Senior and age groups)
  (Age groups)
  (Senior)
  (Age groups)
  (Age groups)
  (Senior, junior and age groups)
  (Age groups)

Results

Senior

Junior and age groups

References

2022 in gymnastics
Pan American Gymnastics Championships
International gymnastics competitions hosted by Colombia
2022 in Colombian sport
Pan American Acrobatic Gymnastics Championships